The Cruickshank Botanic Gardens in Aberdeen, Scotland, were built on land presented to the University of Aberdeen in 1898 by Miss Anne Cruickshank to commemorate her brother Dr. Alexander Cruickshank.

The Cruickshank Botanic Garden is partly owned and financed by the university and partly by the Cruickshank Botanic Gardens Trust. The Friends of the Cruickshank Botanic Garden actively promote and support the garden. Each summer vacation the Friends provide a bursary to allow an undergraduate student interested in botany to gain work experience in the gardens.

Although open to the public, the gardens are extensively used for both teaching and research purposes. The Natural History Centre regularly guides school parties round the Garden, and the School of Biological Sciences of the University of Aberdeen holds a reception for graduands and their guests here each July.

See also

Green spaces and walkways in Aberdeen

References

External links
  Extract taken from the University of Aberdeen webpage

University of Aberdeen
Botanical gardens in Scotland
Gardens in Aberdeen
1898 establishments in Scotland